Uncle Billy may refer to:

People with the nickname
 William Hicks (born 1817), 19th century emigrant to California and landowner
 William K. Martin (1867–1949), American football and baseball coach
 William Thomas Hamilton (frontiersman) (1822–1908)
 William Tecumseh Sherman (1820–1891), American Civil War general 
 William H. Spurgeon (1829-1915), founder of Santa Ana, California
 William Carlos Stone (1859–1939), American philatelist
 William Barton, 19th century founder of Barton Springs Pool in Austin, Texas
 Uncle Billy Wilson, 19th century American miner and rancher

Fictional characters
Uncle Billy in the 1911 American silent film Billy the Kid
Uncle Billy in the 1916 American silent film Pidgin Island
Uncle Billy in the 1935 American dramatic film The Littlest Rebel
Uncle Billy, in the 1946 American Christmas film It's a Wonderful Life
Uncle Billy in the 1961 American Western film Posse from Hell
Uncle Billy in the 1990 film Slumber Party Massacre III
Uncle Billy in the 2007 film Turquoise Rose
Uncle Billy Burly in the 1936 American drama film Career Woman
Uncle Billy Cleaver in the 1950s/60s TV series Leave It to Beaver
Uncle Billy Possum in the 1970s anime TV series Fables of the Green Forest
Uncle Billy in the 1994 novel At Home in Mitford

See also
Uncle Willy (disambiguation)

Lists of people by nickname